The 2019 Italian Basketball Supercup, also known as Zurich Connect Supercoppa 2019 for sponsorship reasons, was the 25th edition of the super cup tournament, organized by the Lega Basket Serie A (LBA).

AX Armani Exchange Milano were the defending champions.

Banco di Sardegna Sassari went to win his 2nd Supercup by beating Umana Reyer Venezia 83–80 in the Finals. Curtis Jerrells was named MVP of the competition.

It was played at the PalaFlorio arena in Bari on 21 and 22 September 2019.

Participant teams

Qualified for the tournament were Vanoli Cremona and New Basket Brindisi, as Italian Cup finalists, Banco di Sardegna Sassari and Umana Reyer Venezia as LBA Playoffs finalist.

Bracket

Semifinals

Vanoli Cremona vs. Banco di Sardegna Sassari

Umana Reyer Venezia vs. Happy Casa Brindisi

Final

Banco di Sardegna Sassari vs. Umana Reyer Venezia

Sponsors

Source: LBA

References

External links
 LBA Supercoppa official website

Italian Basketball Cup
2018–19 in Italian basketball
2019–20 in Italian basketball